Satun is a town (thesaban mueang) in southern Thailand, capital of the Satun Province. It covers the whole tambon Phiman of Mueang Satun. Satun lies 985 km south of Bangkok. As of 2005 it has a population of 21,498.

Climate
Satun has a tropical monsoon climate (Am) with a short dry season in January and February and a prolonged wet season running from March to December. The highest monthly rainfall occurs in September and October with average monthly rainfall above 320 mm. The average annual high temperature in Satun is 32.6 °C and the average annual low temperature is 23.7 °C.

Transportation
Satun is connected to Malaysian Langkawi Island by direct ferry service.

Telecommunication
Satun hosts Thailand's landing points for optical fiber submarine communications cable Segment FEA (FLAG Europe Asia) of the 28,000-kilometer-long FLAG (Fiber-Optic Link Around the Globe); and for the 49,000-kilometer-long SEA-ME-WE 3, which links regions of south-east Asia to regions of the Middle East and Western Europe.

References

External links

Populated places in Satun province
Malaysia–Thailand border crossings
Cities and towns in Thailand